David William "Dai" Lawrence (18 January 1947 – 21 July 2009) was a Welsh footballer who spent four seasons as a professional at his hometown club Swansea City in the late 1960s and early 1970s.

Lawrence joined Swansea in May 1967 from non-league Merthyr Tydfil, and was the team's right-back when Swansea were promoted from Division Four in 1969–70.

In 1971, Lawrence was released by Swansea, and he subsequently returned to the non-league game, playing one season for Chelmsford City before an injury forced him to retire from the game. He then moved back to Swansea, where he worked as a carpenter. He died of a suspected heart attack in July 2009, aged 62.

References

1947 births
2009 deaths
Welsh footballers
Merthyr Tydfil F.C. players
Swansea City A.F.C. players
Chelmsford City F.C. players
Footballers from Swansea
Association football defenders